Chit Phumisak (also spelt Jit Poumisak; , ; 25 September 1930 – 5 May 1966) was a Thai Marxist historian, activist, author, philologist,  poet, songwriter, and communist revolutionary. His most influential book was The Face of Thai Feudalism (โฉมหน้าศักดินาไทย, Chom Na Sakdina Thai), written in 1957 under the pseudonym Somsamai Srisuthonphan (สมสมัย ศรีศูทรพรรณ). Other pen names used by Chit include Kawi Kanmuang (กวีการเมือง, 'Political Poet') and Kawi Srisayam (กวี ศรีสยาม, 'Siamese Poet').  He has been described as the "Che Guevara of Thailand".

Biography 

Born into a poor family in Prachinburi Province, eastern Thailand, he studied philology and history at Chulalongkorn University in Bangkok. It was as a student that Chit first became exposed to Marxism; in 1953 he was hired by the U.S. embassy to help assist William J. Gedney, an American linguist working in Thailand, to translate The Communist Manifesto into Thai (in an attempt to scare the Thai government into taking a tougher stance against communism).

His writings were anti-nationalist and progressive and were viewed as a threat to the state by the harshly anti-communist government of Sarit Thanarat. He was arrested in 1957, branded a communist, and after six years in jail was declared not guilty by a court and set free.

In 1965, he joined the Communist Party of Thailand, headquartered in the jungles of the Phu Phan Mountains, in Sakhon Nakhon Province. On May 5, 1966 he was shot dead by villagers near the village Nong Kung in Waritchaphum district. His body was burned and no proper ceremony for his death occurred until 1989, when his remains were finally placed in a stupa at the nearby Wat Prasittisangwon.

There is a small dispute over his death. Paul M. Handley, the author of The King Never Smiles, states that Chit was executed by government officials near the Phu Phan mountains shortly after he was released from jail.

Selected works 

 โฉมหน้าศักดินาไทย (Chom Na Sakdina Thai; "The Real Face of Thai Feudalism")
 รวมบทกวีและงานวิจารณ์ศิลปวรรณคดีของ กวีการเมือง (Ruam botkawi lae ngan wichan sinlapa wannakhadi khong Kawi Kanmueang; "Collected Poems and Literary Reviews by 'Political Poet'"), under pseudonym "Kawi Kanmuang"
 ความเป็นมาของคำสยาม ไทย, ลาว และขอม และลักษณะทางสังคมของชื่อชนชาติ (Khwampenma khong kham Sayam Thai Lao lae Khom lae laksana thangsangkhom khong chue chonchat; "Etymology of the terms Siam, Thai, Lao, and Khom, and the Social Characteristics of Nationalities")
 ตำนานนครวัด ("Tamnarn nakhon wat"; "The Legendary of Angkor Wat")
 เพลง "แสงดาวแห่งศรัทธา" ("Phleng Sangdao Hang Sat-tha"; "Song of the Stars of Faith")
 เพลง "ภูพานปฏิวัติ" ("Phleng Phuphan Patiwat"; "Song of the Revolution of Phuphan")

Further reading

References 

Chit Phumisak
Chit Phumisak
1930 births
1966 deaths
Chit Phumisak
Chit Phumisak
Chit Phumisak
Chit Phumisak
Chit Phumisak
Chit Phumisak
Chit Phumisak
Chit Phumisak
Chit Phumisak
Chit Phumisak
Chit Phumisak
20th-century linguists
20th-century poets
Chit Phumisak
Chit Phumisak
Chit Phumisak
Anti-nationalism
20th-century philosophers